The 2004 Summer Olympics, officially known as the Games of the XXVIII Olympiad, were a summer multi-sport event held in Athens, the capital city of Greece, from 13 to 29 August 2004. A total of 10,625 athletes from 201 countries represented by National Olympic Committees participated in these games, competing in 301 events in 28 sports. Kiribati and Timor Leste competed for the first time in these Olympic Games.

Athletes from 74 countries won at least one medal. The United States won the most gold medals (36), the most silver medals (40) and the most medals overall (101). China finished second on the International Olympic Committee medal table (though third in terms of total medals), the country's best performance until the 2008 Beijing Olympics, where they was hosts. Russia finished third, (second in total medals), and also won the most bronze medals (38). Host nation Greece finished fifteenth, with six gold, six silver, and four bronze medals, in its best total medal haul since 1896.

Australia became the first nation to improve their gold medal total at the Games immediately after hosting a Summer Olympics. The United Arab Emirates, Paraguay and Eritrea won their first ever Olympic medals. Israel, Chile, Dominican Republic, Georgia, Chinese Taipei and United Arab Emirates won their first Olympic gold medals.



Medal table

The medal table is based on information provided by the International Olympic Committee (IOC) and is consistent with IOC convention in its published medal tables. By default, the table is ordered by the number of gold medals the athletes from a nation have won (in this context, a nation is an entity represented by a National Olympic Committee). The number of silver medals is taken into consideration next and then the number of bronze medals. If nations are still tied, equal ranking is given and they are listed alphabetically.

In boxing and judo, two bronze medals were awarded in each weight class, so the total number of bronze medals is greater than the total number of gold and silver medals.

Key

Podium sweeps

Changes in medal standings

During the Games the following changes in medal standings occurred:
 Greek weightlifter Leonidas Sabanis was the first, losing his bronze medal in the men's 62 kg competition, so fourth placed Venezuelan Israel José Rubio received the medal in his place.
 Russian athlete Irina Korzhanenko lost her gold medal in women's shot put due to doping, with Cuban Yumileidi Cumbá Jay replacing her as the Olympic champion, German Nadine Kleinert receiving the silver medal, and Svetlana Krivelyova of Russia receiving the bronze medal. Krivelyova was later stripped of her bronze for the same reason.
 Hungarian Róbert Fazekas was stripped of his gold medal in the men's discus throw, shifting the gold medal to Virgilijus Alekna of Lithuania, the silver medal to Zoltán Kővágó of Hungary, and the bronze medal to Aleksander Tammert of Estonia.
 Adrián Annus, also from Hungary, was stripped of the gold medal in the men's hammer throw, handing the Olympic title to Koji Murofushi of Japan, with Ivan Tsikhan of Belarus taking the silver, and Eşref Apak of Turkey taking the bronze medal.
 Ferenc Gyurkovics, also from Hungary, was stripped silver medal in weightlifting +105 kg, Ihor Razoronov from Ukraine received silver, and Gleb Pisarevskiy from Russia received bronze.
Since the conclusion of the 2004 Games, doping scandals have resulted in the revocations of medals from numerous athletes, thus affecting the medal standings.

See also

 All-time Olympic Games medal table
 2004 Summer Paralympics medal table

References

External links
 
 
 

Medal table
Summer Olympics medal tables